Corrine Koslo (born c. 1958) is a Canadian actress. Primarily a stage actress most prominently associated with the Shaw Festival, she has also had supporting and voice roles in film and television.

A 1981 graduate of the Vancouver Playhouse's acting school, she has acted on stage throughout Canada. She is a two-time Dora Mavor Moore Award winner for her performances in Bunnicula and Seussical; a two-time Jessie Richardson Award winner for her performances in Love and Anger and Sweeney Todd; and an Elizabeth Sterling Haynes Award winner for her performance in Blithe Spirit.

Her appearances at the Shaw Festival have included productions of Drama at Inish, Cat on a Hot Tin Roof, Brief Encounters, The Entertainer, The Mystery of Edwin Drood, The Matchmaker, The Apple Cart, The Seagull, Hobson's Choice, Holiday, Tonight We Improvise, Come Back, Little Sheba, and Lady Windermere's Fan. She has also appeared in Vancouver Playhouse productions of William Shakespeare plays, including Much Ado About Nothing and Romeo and Juliet.

She appeared in minor supporting roles in the films Switching Channels, Ernest Goes to School, Hard Core Logo, Better Than Chocolate, and Best in Show. On television, she is best known for her role as Rachel Lynde in the 2017 version of Anne, and has voiced characters in the animated series Beverly Hills Teens, Babar, and The New Adventures of Madeline. In 2017, it was announced that Koslo would voice the role of Emma in Corner Gas Animated, following the death of original Corner Gas performer Janet Wright.

Filmography

Film

Television

References

External links

20th-century Canadian actresses
21st-century Canadian actresses
Canadian film actresses
Canadian stage actresses
Canadian television actresses
Canadian voice actresses
Canadian musical theatre actresses
Canadian Shakespearean actresses
1958 births
Dora Mavor Moore Award winners
Living people
Place of birth missing (living people)